Ted Wilson (born 8 August 1943, official name George William Wilson II) is a former Ice Capades performer and ice rink manager in the U.S., UAE, Hong Kong and China. Wilson became a tireless visionary and advocate of the sport of ice skating in parts of the world where skating was uncommon prior to his arrival.

Early life

Life as a competitive skater

Life as a professional skater 

 1968? World Professional Figure Skating Championships

Life in Dubai (1980-1987) 

 1980 - 1987 Manager of The Galleria Ice Rink - Hyatt Regency Dubai
 1980? - 1999? Director of Ice Skating Institute of America (ISIA) International Section

Life in Hong Kong (1987-2002) 
1987 April - 2002 May Manager of Cityplaza Ice Palace, Hong Kong
1989 Created the 1st ISI Skate Asia 1989
1989 Trained the 1st Hong Kong's skater, 1st Asian skater and 7th skater, Sunny Man, passing ISI Freestylel 10. Hereafter, 4 more skaters from Hong Kong passed Freestyle 10 under Ted's umbrella:
Rita Dolly Au Yeung
Chan Pak Ling Nicholas
Chan Yan Ho Brian
Leung Hei Wai Derek
1994 ISI Man of the Year
1998 - 2002 May Manager of 2 ice rinks - Festival Walk Glacier and Cityplaza Ice Palace
2000 Founded Ice Skating Institute of Asia (ISIAsia)
2000 - 2003 President of Ice Skating Institute of Asia (ISIAsia)
2001 Initiated the formation of Hong Kong Ice Theatre (2001-2013)
2001 ISI International Merit Award

Life in China (2002 - 2011 June) 

2004 Opened World Ice Arena in MIXC Shopping Center in Shenzhen, China
2009 March - 2010 Opened World Ice Arena in MIXC Shopping Center in Hangzhou, China

Life in Hong Kong (2011 June - 2013 September 21) 

 2011 June - 2013 September CEO of Ice Rink Concepts Limited, a division of The Development Studio

Back to US (2013 September 21 - 2013 Oct 18) 
2013 ISI Ice Skating Hall of Fame
Passed away on 18 October, 2013 at 5:10pm in California.

In Memory of Ted 
Nathen Chen website
2013 Skate Asia - In Memory of Ted Wilson
2013 Facebook Page - In Memory of Ted Wilson
2014 ISI Edge - In Memory of Ted Wilson

External links 
Ted's Facebook Page 
Ted's Twitter 
Ted's Linkedin 
Ted's YouTube Channel 
2009 - 2011 Ted's blog
2011 - 2013 Ted's blog

In the media 

1994 February 26 -  South China Morning Post - Wizards on ice rush for gold
2004 May 9 - South China Morning Post - Shenzhen breaks the ice with Olympic-sized skating rink

References

Skaters
Ice skating in China